Ephraim Heller is an inventor and entrepreneur, and the current CEO of SynAgile Corporation.  SynAgile is developing new therapies for treatment of Parkinson's disease.  In 1992, he was the  co-founder and first CEO of TheraSense, which went public and was later sold to Abbott Labs for $1.2 billion.  He was also co-founder, chairman and CEO of AngioScore and led the product development and FDA approval. AngioScore was acquired in 2014 for $230 million plus milestone payments.  Prior to its acquisition, the company sold more than 300,000 AngioSculpt catheters in over 65 countries around the world.  He was previously a venture partner at 7 Health Ventures. Heller holds an MBA from Yale School of Management and he has an AB in Physics from Harvard. His father is the engineer Adam Heller.

Patents 
Ephraim Heller holds over 100 US patents, including patents on blood glucose monitors and photocatalytic materials.

References

External links
Profile in Businessweek
Abbott Labs: "In April 2004, Abbott announced it had completed the acquisition of TheraSense, a leader in developing blood glucose self-monitoring devices that require very small blood samples to deliver rapid test results".
Abbott's Annual Report for Fiscal Year 2003 featured the acquisition of Therasense on its cover.
New York Times, January 14, 2004: "A deal by Abbott Laboratories to buy TheraSense for $1.2 billion in cash to bolster its diabetes drugs sent TheraSense up 31 percent , gaining $6.34, to $26.64. Abbott rose 24 cents, to $44.43."

Year of birth missing (living people)
Living people
20th-century American inventors
21st-century American inventors
Harvard University alumni
American health care chief executives
Yale School of Management alumni